The Jasin  Square is a town square in Jasin Town, Jasin District, Melaka, Malaysia.

Architecture
The square features facilities such as reflection place, playground, stage, rest hut and extreme sport area.

See also
 List of tourist attractions in Melaka

References

Jasin District
Squares in Malacca